Michael Jang (born 1951) is an American documentary photographer. Jang is best known for his 1970s photographs of life in Los Angeles and San Francisco, with subjects ranging from his family to punk bands and street scenes.

Early life
Jang was born in Marysville, California in 1951. Jang studied at CalArts in Los Angeles, receiving a Bachelor of Fine Arts degree in 1973. Initially a design major, Jang switched to photography after being exposed to the work of Diane Arbus, Garry Winogrand and Lee Friedlander. While at CalArts, Jang photographed the raunchiness of the student environment; in 2013 he published the photos in a book titled College. During his time at CalArts he used fake press credentials to access events and parties at The Beverly Hilton hotel, where he was able to photograph a range of people from the unknown to famous musicians and politicians. 

Later in the 1970s, he moved to San Francisco, where he would receive an  MFA degree from the San Francisco Art Institute. While in grad school he photographed the San Francisco punk rock scene, including a portrait of Johnny Rotten following his last Sex Pistols performance.

Work
Following art school, Jang continued to pursue creative projects while earning a living as a commercial photographer in San Francisco. He was relatively unknown as an artist until 2002, when the San Francisco Museum of Modern Art acquired several of his photographs. The subjects of his work are mainly vernacular and street photography. His 1973 series The Jangs documents the assimilation of his Asian-American family. His 1983 series Summer Weather documented auditioning weather reporters.

In 2019 the McEvoy Foundation for the Arts staged a retrospective exhibition of his work. The same year, Atelier Editions published a retrospective monograph of his work titled Who is Michael Jang?

Publications
Far East of Suburbia. Michael Jang, n.d. .
The Jangs. Michael Jang, 2009. .
One of a Kind. [Los Angeles]: Hamburger Eyes, 2011. .
Summer Weather. San Francisco: Owl & Tiger Books, 2012. .
College. [San Francisco]: Hamburger Eyes, 2013. Special edition, 2014. .
The Jangs × Los Angeles. Los Angeles, California: Pascale Georgiev and Kingston Trinder, 2014. . 
To Mike. Los Angeles: Atelier, 2016. .
Who is Michael Jang? Los Angeles: Atelier, 2019. . With an introduction by Sandra S. Phillips, a foreword by Erik Kessels and texts by Kingston Trinder. Edition of 3000 copies.

Collections
Jang's work is held in the collection of the San Francisco Museum of Modern Art.

References

External links

Michael Jang's earlier parody website

21st-century American photographers
20th-century American photographers
1951 births
Living people